Naryshkin is a Russian masculine surname, and its feminine counterpart is Naryshkina. The name may refer to:

 Members of the noble Naryshkin family, including:
 Kirill Naryshkin (1623–1691), Russian boyar and maternal grandfather of Peter the Great
 Natalya Naryshkina (1651–1694), Tsaritsa of Russia and mother of Peter the Great
 Aleksandr Naryshkin (1760–1826), Russian statesman
 Maria Naryshkina (1779–1854), mistress of Alexander I of Russia
 Sergey Naryshkin (born 1954), Russian politician

See also
Naryshkin Baroque, a style of Baroque architecture that was popular in Moscow
Naryshkin-Shuvalov Palace, a neoclassical palace in Saint Petersburg